RSS Victory (88) is the lead ship of the Victory-class corvettes of the Republic of Singapore Navy.

Construction and career
Victory was built by Lürssen Werft in Germany, launched on 8 June 1988 and was commissioned on 18 August 1990.

CARAT 2009 
On 15 June 2009, RSS Intrepid, RSS Conqueror, RSS Vigour, RSS Victory, RSS Stalwart, RSS Endeavour, USS Harpers Ferry, USS Chafee and USS Chung-Hoon participated in the joint exercise in the South China Sea.

Gallery

References

== External links ==

1988 ships
Ships built in Germany
Victory-class corvettes